Neil Lambert is a  Professor in theoretical physics at King's College London. His research is primarily concerned with supersymmetry, string theory and M-theory.

Lambert graduated from University of Toronto with BSc in mathematics and physics in 1992. He did his graduate studies at Cambridge University.

He was also a staff physicist at CERN from 2010 to 2013.

Education 
BSc, University of Toronto (Graduated in 1992).

PhD, Cambridge University (Advisor: Paul Townsend. Graduated in 1996).

Career 
From 2000 to 2005 he held a PPARC Advanced Fellowship at King's College London, and later was given a lectureship and later a chair in 2009. He has also held post-doctoral positions at École normale supérieure (Paris) and Rutgers University. From 2010 to 2013 he was a staff physicist at CERN. He also holds the post of honorary advisor at BMUCO, which is a university student-led science organisation.

Selected publications
Bagger J, Lambert N. Gauge symmetry and supersymmetry of multiple M2-branes. Physical Review D. 2008 Mar 7;77(6):065008.   According to Google Scholar, it has been cited 1307 times.
Bagger J, Lambert N. Modeling multiple M2-branes. Physical Review D. 2007 Feb 26;75(4):045020. According to Google Scholar, this article has been cited   975 times
Bagger J, Lambert N. Comments on multiple M2-branes. Journal of High Energy Physics. 2008 Feb 28;2008(02):105.
Bagger J, Lambert N. Three-algebras and N= 6 Chern-Simons gauge theories. Physical Review D. 2009 Jan 7;79(2):025002.*	
Lambert N, Papageorgakis C, Schmidt-Sommerfeld M. M5-branes, D4-branes and quantum 5D super-Yang-Mills. Journal of High Energy Physics. 2011 Jan 1;2011(1):83.

References 

Living people
Year of birth missing (living people)
Place of birth missing (living people)
University of Toronto alumni
Alumni of the University of Cambridge
Academics of King's College London
People associated with CERN
Theoretical physicists
Nationality missing
21st-century physicists